A sensitivity speck is a place in silver halide crystal where latent image is preferentially formed. This is very often the site of shallow electron traps, such as crystalline defect (particularly edge dislocation) and silver sulfide specks created by sulfur sensitization process.

When a photon is absorbed by a silver halide crystal, a free-carrier (electron in the conduction band) is generated. This free-carrier can migrate through the crystal lattice of silver halide, until captured by the shallow electron trap, where the electron is likely to reduce an interstitial silver ion to form an atomic silver. Subsequent exposure can grow the size of silver cluster through the same mechanism. This forms the latent image where the silver cluster becomes large enough to render the entire crystal developable in developer solution.

Science of photography